Islamic criminal law is criminal law in accordance with Sharia. Strictly speaking, Islamic law does not have a distinct corpus of "criminal law". It divides crimes into three different categories depending on the offense – Hudud (crimes "against God", whose punishment is fixed in the Quran and the Hadiths), Qisas (crimes against an individual or family whose punishment is equal retaliation in the Quran and the Hadiths), and Tazir (crimes whose punishment is not specified in the Quran and the Hadiths, and is left to the discretion of the ruler or Qadi, i.e. judge). Some add the fourth category of Siyasah (crimes against government), while others consider it as part of either Hadd or Tazir crimes.

Traditional sharia courts, unlike modern Western courts, do not use jury or prosecutors on the behalf of society. Crimes against God are prosecuted by the state as hudud crimes, and all other criminal matters, including murder and bodily injury, are treated as disputes between individuals with an Islamic judge deciding the outcome based on sharia fiqh such as Hanafi, Maliki, Shafi'i, Hanbali and Jafari followed in the Islamic jurisdiction.

In practice, since early on in Islamic history, criminal cases were usually handled by ruler-administered courts or local police using procedures which were only loosely related to sharia. In the modern era, sharia-based criminal laws were widely replaced by statutes inspired by European models, although in recent decades several countries reintroduced elements of Islamic penal law into their legal codes under the growing influence of Islamist movements.

Hudud

Traditional Islamic jurisprudence divides crimes into offenses against God and those against man. The former are seen to violate God's hudud, or 'boundaries'. These punishments were specified by the Quran, and in some instances by the Sunnah. The offenses incurring hudud punishments are zina (unlawful sexual intercourse), unfounded accusations of zina, consuming intoxicants, highway robbery, and some forms of theft. Jurists have differed as to whether apostasy and rebellion against a lawful Islamic ruler are hudud crimes.

Hudud punishments range from public lashing to publicly stoning to death, amputation of hands and crucifixion. Hudud crimes cannot be pardoned by the victim or by the state, and the punishments must be carried out in public. However, the evidentiary standards for these punishments were often impossibly high, and they were infrequently implemented in practice. For example, meeting hudud requirements for zina and theft was virtually impossible without a confession, which could be invalidated by a retraction. Based on a hadith, jurists stipulated that hudud punishments should be averted by the slightest doubts or ambiguities (shubuhat). The harsher hudud punishments were meant to deter and to convey the gravity of offenses against God, rather than to be carried out.

During the 19th century, sharia-based criminal laws were replaced by statutes inspired by European models nearly everywhere in the Islamic world, except some particularly conservative regions such as the Arabian peninsula. The Islamic revival of the late 20th century brought along calls by Islamist movements for full implementation of sharia. Reinstatement of hudud punishments has had particular symbolic importance for these groups because of their Quranic origin, and their advocates have often disregarded the stringent traditional restrictions on their application. In practice, in the countries where hudud have been incorporated into the legal code under Islamist pressure, they have often been used sparingly or not at all, and their application has varied depending on local political climate. Their use has been a subject of criticism and debate.

Qisas

Qisas is the Islamic principle of "an eye for an eye".  This category includes the crimes of murder and battery.

Punishment is either exact retribution or compensation (Diyya).

The issue of qisas gained considerable attention in the Western media in 2009 when Ameneh Bahrami, an Iranian woman blinded in an acid attack, demanded that her attacker be blinded as well. The concept of punishment under Qisas is not based on "society" versus the "individual" (the wrong doer), but rather that of "individuals and families" (victim(s)) versus "individuals and families" (wrong doer(s)). Thus the victim has the ability to pardon the perpetrator and withhold punishment even in the case of murder. Bahrami pardoned her attacker and stopped his punishment (drops of acid in his eyes) just before it was to be administered in 2011.

Diyyat

Diyya is compensation paid to the heirs of a victim.  In Arabic the word means both blood money and ransom.

The Quran specifies the principle of Qisas (i.e. retaliation), but prescribes that one should seek compensation (Diyya) and not demand retribution.

We have prescribed for thee therein (the Torah) ‘a life for a life, and an eye for an eye, and a nose for a nose, and an ear for an ear, and a tooth for a tooth, and for wounds retaliation;’ but whoso remits it, it is an expiation for him, but he whoso will not judge by what God has revealed, these be the unjust.

Tazir

Tazir includes any crime that does not fit into Hudud or Qisas and which therefore has no punishment specified in the Quran. Tazir in Islamic criminal jurisprudence are those crimes where the punishment is at the discretion of the state, the ruler or a Qadi, for actions considered sinful or destructive of public order, but which are not punishable as hadd or qisas under Sharia.

See also
 Capital and corporal punishment in Islam
 Hudood Ordinances
 Repentance in Islam

References

Further reading

Short surveys 

 
 M. Cherif Bassiouni (1997), Crimes and the Criminal Process, Arab Law Quarterly, Vol. 12, No. 3 (1997), pp. 269–286 (via JSTOR)
 Basic features of Islamic criminal law Christine Schirrmacher (2008), Islam Institute, Germany
 Islamic Criminal Law and Procedure Matthew Lipman, Boston College International and Comparative Law Review, Volume XII, Issue 1, pp. 29–62

Books